Lamma Bada Yatathanna is an Arabic muwashshah of the Nahawand maqam. The poem is considered one of the most famous Arabic pieces of its era.

Identity of the poet 

Lyrics 
When she appeared with her walk so proudly,
The beauty of my love has seduced me
N' how with her gaze she enslaved me!

When she bends she's a branch that captivates
And Oh! in what troubles she puts me!

I got 'no' mercy for my wail
In love cause of this pain
'But'(and only) from the Queen of Beauty!

Music singers 
In modern times, the song had versions recorded by Arabic artists including Fairuz, Souad Massi, Lena Chamamyan, Nabyla Maan, Hamza El Din ,Sami Yusuf and Talia Lahoud.

References

Arabic music
Arabic poetry